Sonny Nevaquaya was a Comanche flute player and maker from Oklahoma.  He began his professional career in 1993 when he recorded an album entitled Spirit of the Flute.  His second album, Viva Kokopelli was released in 1996.  He has also released an album in honor of his father, Doc Tate Nevaquaya - Legend and Legacy.  Nevaquaya lived in Florida until his death on February 27, 2019.

Films
Songkeepers (1999, 48 min.).  Directed by Bob Hercules and Bob Jackson.  Produced by Dan King.  Lake Forest, Illinois: America's Flute Productions.  Five distinguished traditional flute artists - Tom Mauchahty-Ware, Sonny Nevaquaya, R. Carlos Nakai, Hawk Littlejohn, Kevin Locke – talk about their instrument and their songs and the role of the flute and its music in their tribes.

References

https://www.swoknews.com/obituaries/lean-%E2%80%9Csonny%E2%80%9D-tate-nevaquaya

Year of birth missing
2019 deaths
Comanche people
Musicians from Oklahoma
Musicians from Florida
Place of birth missing